Chia Ching-teh (1880-1960) was a politician in the Republic of China. He was the Vice Premier in 1949.

Background
Chia was educated at Hubei Military Academy. Chinese government records indicated that he was a member of the Examination Yuan, serving as minister at the Ministry of Personnel. On June 11, 1949, he was appointed Secretary General of the Executive Yuan by Yen Hsi-shan.

Diplomatic papers at the U.S. State Department revealed that he was appointed by the acting President Li Zhongren in March 1949 along with a number of new Cabinet personnel. The list was published by Chung Yang Jih Pao.

Chia died in October 1960.

References

Civil Service Ministers of the Republic of China
Taiwanese Presidents of the Examination Yuan
Chinese police officers
1880 births
1960 deaths
Taiwanese people from Shanxi
Republic of China politicians from Shanxi
Politicians from Jincheng